The third season of the Caribbean reality television show Caribbean's Next Top Model premiered on January 30, 2017. The show features a group of aspiring models from the entire Caribbean region, with the winner being offered a career in the modelling industry. The third season of the show has 14 contestants and was taped in Grenada. Also a new judge was added to the panel.

Cast

Contestants
(Ages stated are at start of contest)

Judges
 Wendy Fitzwilliam (host)
 Pedro Virgil 
 Socrates McKinney

Episodes

Results 

 The contestant was eliminated
 The contestant won the competition

Photo shoot guide
Episode 1 photo shoot: Comp cards (casting)
Episode 2 photo shoot: Makeovers
Episode 3 photo shoot: Football cheerleaders
Episode 4 photo shoot: Posing underwater
Episode 5 photo shoot: Coco & Breezy sunglasses
Episode 6 photo shoot: Neon swimwear in the woods
Episode 7 photo shoot: Embodying Jab Jab
Episode 8 video shoot: Mock sports forecast 
Episode 9 photo shoot: Glamorous women in a Grenadian market
Episode 11 photo shoot: SHE Magazine Covers

References
1 ^ https://www.facebook.com/409711332526064/videos/544566592373870/
2 ^ http://www.cwc.com/live/news-and-media/press-releases/caribbeans-next-top-model-returns-to-the-catwalk-with-flow-tv-partnership.html
3 ^ https://www.facebook.com/caribbeansnexttopmodel?fref=ts
4 ^ https://www.facebook.com/caribbeansnexttopmodel?fref=ts

Television in the Caribbean
2017 television seasons
3